Reichardia tingitana is a species of plant in the family Asteraceae that is distributed primarily throughout Mediterranean and West Asia. It is known by the common name false sowthistle.

Description
The leaves have an alternate arrangement and are entire with serrated margins. No stipule is present on the petiole.

An annual plant, its flowering period is from March to May. Like most angiosperms, its flowers are hermaphroditic. The petals are of a yellow color.

Main habitat
As a glycophyte, it is accustomed to growing in saline soils. Arid deserts and shrub-steppes are its most common habitats. It also grows well in sandy depressions in the Middle East.

In France, it is a naturalized species. Another country it has been introduced to is Australia, where it is commonly recognized as a minor weed. There its main habitats are urban sites, coastal dunes and alluvial plains.

It has been recorded in Bahrain, Kuwait, Qatar, the United Arab Emirates and eastern Saudi Arabia. Uses in folk medicine have been recorded in the Middle East, its leaves being used to treat ailments such as constipation, colic and inflamed eyes.

References

External links

Cichorieae
Halophytes
Flora of North Africa
Flora of France
Flora of Spain
Flora of Israel
Flora of Palestine (region)
Flora of Cyprus
Flora of Australia
Flora of Bahrain
Flora of Kuwait
Flora of Qatar
Flora of Saudi Arabia